David J. Dennis is a civil rights activist since the 1960s. He grew up in the segregated area of Omega, Louisiana.  He worked as co-director of the Council of Federated Organizations (COFO), as director of Mississippi's Congress of Racial Equality (CORE), and as one of the organizers of the Mississippi Freedom Summer of 1964. He worked closely with both Bob Moses and Medgar Evers as well as members of SNCC, the Student Nonviolent Coordinating Committee. His first involvement in the Civil Rights Movement was at a Woolworth sit-in organized by CORE and he went on to become a Freedom Rider in 1961. More recently, Dennis has put his activism toward a new project; the Algebra Project, which is a nonprofit organization run by Bob Moses that aims to improve the mathematics education for minority children. Dennis also speaks about his experiences in the movement through an organization called Dave Dennis Connections.

Early life

Dave Dennis was born in 1940 on a plantation of a sharecropper in Omega, Louisiana. All he knew was a life of segregation, he says in one interview with Ebony magazine, "I grew up in this life where you had to stay in your place" (Ugwuomo). Dennis grew up extremely poor, in the Shreveport area where people didn't have even the most basic utilities. He didn't know what it was like to have these basic utilities until he was nine years old. Even after Dennis' family moved to the inner city of Louisiana, black citizens, including his family, were "only able to get basic utilities by entering white territory." He was the first of his family to graduate from high school. He graduated from Southern High School which was connected to Southern University where the beginnings of student protests were forming. Dennis during this time in his life wasn't interested in being a part of any protests or demonstrations, he says, "I didn’t have this interest in civil rights that you might think most people are born with". He didn't want any part of the civil rights activism, "Things were happening [in the country] and I was trying to run from them”.

College
Dave Dennis attended Dillard University in New Orleans and continued to ignore the civil rights protests until he met a young woman named Doris Castle, who supported the movement, and became involved with the movement through Castle. "She was handing out meeting flyers and speaking to a group of students on campus one afternoon. I thought she was cute, walked over to talk to her after her presentation and, sooner than I realized, agreed to attend a CORE demonstration," he said. This was Dennis' first demonstration, and he was part of a sit-in at a Woolworth store in New Orleans. This was his first of 30 arrests in relation to the Civil Rights Movement. However, the turning point when Dennis decided to become involved in the movement was a statement said in the meeting debating whether to continue the Freedom Rides or not when someone stood up and said, "There is no space in this room for both God and fear." He made a choice to be on that bus, to continue the ride. Dennis dropped out of school and started this new path of his life., although he eventually received his Bachelor of Arts and Bachelor of Science degrees from Dillard University and a Juris Doctor from the University of Michigan Law School.

Organizations

Co-director of Council of Federated Organizations (COFO)
Mississippi director of the Congress of Racial Equality (CORE)
One of the coordinators of the Mississippi Freedom Summer

Important events

Dennis began his activism when he became involved in a Woolworth sit-in in New Orleans during his college years. Dave Dennis was also one of the Freedom Riders to continue the original Freedom Ride from Alabama to Jackson, Mississippi in 1961. The freedom ride was the turning point in his activism. Dennis tried to establish a CORE presence in Mississippi that was previously lacking, by being active in the Delta Project and in the Jackson boycott, and also set up a Home Industry Cooperative in Ruleville which consisted of eighteen local women who made rugs, quilts, and aprons to sell to northern civil rights supporters. Dennis also spent time in Hattiesburg where he met a local woman, Mattie Bivins, whom he married.

Dennis was frustrated with CORE's lack of support in Mississippi. However CORE wasn't pleased with Dennis’ strategies; for one, he didn't care which organization got the credit for the successes of the movement, but they still valued Dave Dennis. Dennis wanted to establish a voter registration drive in Madison County, Mississippi, “For Dennis, Madison County was the ideal location for a CORE project. Blacks there made up more than 70 percent of the county’s 33,000 inhabitants and constituted over 60 percent of Canton’s 10,000 residents”. Dennis also proposed to CORE that Canton was in close proximity to Tougaloo College which made it possible to involve college students in the voter registration drive as well. CORE finally agreed and after two years of violence from the police and threats from the Klan, they were unable to organize the black communities in Madison County.

In 1964 Dennis and Moses’ plan for Freedom Summer came to life. Dennis discusses the reasons for bringing in white Northerners as a means for national attention, "we also knew that if a black was killed that there would not be the type of attention, on the state as would be if a white was killed, or if a white was injured badly, it would bring on more attention than if a black was injured. You see there had been blacks killed and blacks beaten in Mississippi for years and although there would be some small uh, little publicity on it, the government never did really act in any type of affirmative manner in order to try to stop that type of violence against black people, and we felt that they would if in terms if that existed towards whites". However, during that summer a tragedy occurred as three of the Freedom Summer volunteers were killed by the Ku Klux Klan. Dennis was impacted greatly by these deaths because he had worked with these men, he was in fact supposed to be with them but couldn't because he had bronchitis. Dennis felt at fault for their deaths, "I feel very responsible for Chaney and them...you never get over that. I guess I will live with it until the day I die". Dennis gave an impassioned eulogy at James Chaney's funeral scolding the "living dead" in Mississippi and all over the country.  Part of his speech was recreated in the film Mississippi Burning.

The deaths of Goodman, Schwerner, and Chaney left Dave Dennis cynical and skeptical of the methods and the cost of the Southern Freedom movement, "a lot of people were hurt or killed because, indirectly, Bob Moses and I would say go do this and go do that... So you don't get over that stuff. It happens. It's part of the ball game. But the thing that hurts more than anything else is the question you can't answer: it is whether or not it was worth it for the gains that you got at the time".

Other activism

Co-organizer of a challenge to the Mississippi Democratic Party at the 1964 National Democratic Convention and also to the Louisiana Democratic Party at 1972 National Democratic Convention.
Co-Organizer of numerous sit-ins and demonstrations in New Orleans, Shreveport, and Baton Rouge in Louisiana and in Hattiesburg, Clarksdale, Canton, and Jackson in Mississippi.
Established the first African American cooperative in the south, the Ruleville Mississippi Quilting Cooperative, which was formed of 18 women from that town.

After the movement
After Dennis disconnected himself from Mississippi, he went to University of Michigan Law School, received a Juris Doctor degree, and eventually opened up his own law firm in Lafayette, Louisiana named David J. Dennis Law Firm. At a reunion for the anniversary of the Freedom Summer in 1989, Dave Dennis reconnected with Bob Moses who he hadn't seen since 1965 and learned of his project to teach algebra to sixth graders in inner-city schools, and Dennis became intrigued by Moses' idea. They wanted to expand the program into the black public schools of the Delta of Mississippi. They eventually expanded into Mississippi as well as Louisiana, Kentucky, and Arkansas.
Today Dennis maintains the position of director and CEO of the Southern Initiative of the Algebra Project: the nonprofit organization that aims to improve minority children's mathematics education. He also speaks about his experiences in the movement and lessons he learned from those experiences. He shows people how they can be involved in their own communities and change the world, he says, in order to make a difference in the world, it doesn't take a lot, but simply looking to oneself, “It [takes] looking in the mirror and saying, ‘What can I do?’”.

Dennis's son, David Dennis Jr., conducted in-depth interviews with his father, supplemented with extensive collateral research, which he edited into a first-person memoir of Dennis's years in The Movement. Interspersed with letters from Dennis, Jr. to his father, the book reflects on that experience, including the phenomenon of "survivors' guilt," as well as the impact on their father-son relationship. Published in 2022, the book is titled The Movement Made Us. Dennis Jr. is the winner of the 2021 American Mosaic Journalism Prize.

External links
 SNCC Digital Gateway: Dave Dennis, Documentary website created by the SNCC Legacy Project and Duke University, telling the story of the Student Nonviolent Coordinating Committee & grassroots organizing from the inside-out

References

1940 births
People from Louisiana
American civil rights activists
Living people
University of Michigan Law School alumni
Dillard University alumni
Activists from Louisiana